Special Olympics is a 1978 American TV movie starring Charles Durning and directed by Lee Phillips for EMI Television.

It was also known as A Special Kind of Love.

Cast
Charles Durning as Carl Gallitzin
Irene Tedrow as Elmira Gallitzin
Mare Winningham as Janice Gallitzin
Philip Brown as Michael Gallitzin
George Parry as Matthew Gallitzin
Herbert Edelman as Doug Ransom
Debra Winger as Sherrie Hensley
Constance Mccashin as Trina Cunningham
James Calvin Nelson as Dr Brennaman

References

External links
Special Olympics at TCMDB
Special Olympics at BFI
Special Olympics at IMDb

1978 television films
1978 films
American television films
Films directed by Lee Philips